The following highways are numbered 988:

United States